Qil (also Romanized as Qīl; also known as Ghail, Gheyl, Ghīl, Gīl, and Kheyl) is a village in Hengam Rural District, Shahab District, Qeshm County, Hormozgan Province, Iran. At the 2006 census, its population was 27, in 5 families.

References 

Populated places in Qeshm County